The Valler Tal  (also) is a valley in the Zillertal Alps in South Tyrol, Italy.

References 
Alpenverein South Tyrol 

Valleys of South Tyrol